Eurotas is a figure in Greek Mythology. Eurotas may also refer to:

Places
 Evrotas (municipality), a municipality of southern Greece
 Eurotas (river), the main river of Laconia in southern Greece
 Another name of the Titarisios, a river of Thessaly, Greece

Ships
 HMS Eurotas, two ships of the Royal Navy
 Evrotas, a ship of the Hellenic Navy
 Eurotas, a clasp of the Naval General Service Medal (British)

Science
 Eurota, a genus of moths
 Telicota eurotas, a species of butterfly
 Eurota Chasmata, a quadrangle on Saturn's moon Dione
 Eurotas, a canal of Mars